Leisenring is an unincorporated community in Fayette County, Pennsylvania, United States. The Leisenring post office carries ZIP code 15455.

References

Unincorporated communities in Fayette County, Pennsylvania
Unincorporated communities in Pennsylvania